The four-sides model (also known as communication square or four-ears model) is a communication model postulated in 1981 by German psychologist Friedemann Schulz von Thun. According to this model every message has four facets though not the same emphasis might be put on each. The four sides of the message are fact, self-disclosure, Social relationship between sender and receiver, and wish or want.

Background 
The four-sides model also known as communication square or four-ears model is a communication model described in 1981 by German psychologist Friedemann Schulz von Thun. It describes the multi-layered structure of human utterances. In it von Thun combined the idea of a postulate (the second axiom) from psychologist Paul Watzlawick, that every message contains content and relational facets, with the three sides of the Organon model by Karl Bühler, that every message might reveal something about the sender, the receiver, and the request at hand. These models are part of the linguistic speech act theory.

The four sides of communication 
Per Schulz von Thun 
 The Factual Level contains statements which are matter of fact like data and facts, which are part of the message.
 In the self-revealing or self-disclosure the speaker - conscious or unintended - reveals something about him or herself, their motives, values, emotions etc.
 In the relationship-layer the speaker expresses, how the sender gets along with the receiver and what they think of each other.
 The wish or want contains the plea or desire, the advice, instruction and possibly the effects which the speaker is seeking.

Every layer of a message can be misunderstood by itself.
The classic example of Schulz von Thun is the front-seat passenger who tells the driver: "Hey, the traffic lights are green". The driver will understand something different, depending on the ear with which he will hear, and will react differently. (On the matter layer he will understand the "fact" "the traffic lights are green", he could also understand it as "Come on, drive! ."-"command", or on the "relationship" could hear a help like "I want to help you, or if he hears behind it: I am in a hurry the passenger reveals part of himself "self-revelatory".") The emphasis on the four layers can be meant differently and also be understood differently. So the sender can stress the appeal of the statement and the receiver can mainly receive the relationship part of the message. This is one of the main reasons for misunderstandings.

The factual level 
The factual level contains what the sender wants to inform about: On the factual level the sender of the news gives data, facts and information statements. It is the sender's task to send this information clearly and understandably. The receiver proves with the "Factual ear", whether the matter message fulfills the criteria of truth (true/untrue) or relevance (relevant/irrelevant) and the completeness (satisfying/something has to be added).

In a long-term team, the matter layer may be clear and in need of only a few words.

The self-revealing level 
The self revealing level contains what the sender would like to reveal about themselves; It contains information about the sender . It may consist of consciously intended self-expression as well as unintended self-disclosure, which is not conscious to the sender (see also Johari window). Thus, every message becomes information about the personality of the sender. The self-revealing ear of the receiver perceives which information about the sender is hidden in the message.

The relationship level 
The relationship layer expresses how the sender gets along with the receiver and what the sender thinks and feels about the receiver. Depending on how the sender talks to the receiver (way of expression, body language, intonation ...) the sender expresses esteem, respect, friendliness, disinterest, contempt or something else.  the sender may express what he thinks about the receiver (you-statement) and how they get along (we-statement).Depending on which message the receiver hears with relationship ear, he feels either depressed, accepted or patronized. Good communication is distinguished by mutual appreciation.

The appeal or plea level 
The appeal or want contains what the sender wants the receiver to do or think . According to von Thun whoever states something, will also affect something. This appeal-message should make the receiver do something or leave something undone.  The attempt to influence someone can be less or more open (advice) or hidden (manipulation). With the "appeal ear" the receiver asks himself: "What should I do, think or feel now?" For Example: "Mothers are very appeal-influenced by children. Mum! The shoes .... Yes! I'll be right there to put them on for you."

Example 
Two people are eating a home-cooked meal together.

The one who didn't cook says: "There is something green in the soup."
 Sender
{|
| Factual level: || There is something green.
|-
| Self-revealing layer: || I don't know what it is.
|-
| Relationship layer: || You should know what it is.
|-
| Appeal layer: || Tell me what it is!
|}

 Receiver
{|
| Factual level: || There is something green.
|-
| Self-revealing layer: || You do not know what the green item is, and that makes you feel uncomfortable.
|-
| Relationship layer: || You think my cooking is questionable.
|-
| Appeal layer: || I should only cook what you know in the future!
|}

The other answers: "If you don't like the taste, you can cook it yourself."

See also 
 : Organon-Modell
 
 
 : communication model

References

Bibliography 
 Friedemann Schulz von Thun: Miteinander reden: Störungen und Klärungen. Psychologie der zwischenmenschlichen Kommunikation. Rowohlt, Reinbek 1981.

External links 
Beschreibung des Vier-Seiten-Modells auf der Website von Friedemann Schulz von Thun

Communication
Interpersonal communication
Behavioural sciences